Sancho Nunes de Barbosa, Lord of Celanova (1070-1130) was a Galician nobleman.

He was the son of Nuño Gutiérrez, Count of Celanova, and Sancha Gomes. He was married twice first with Sancha Henriques, daughter of Henry, Count of Portugal. His second marriage was to Teresa Afonso, possible daughter of Afonso I of Portugal.

References 

1070 births
1130 deaths
11th-century Portuguese people
12th-century Portuguese people
Portuguese nobility
Portuguese Roman Catholics